Scythris nigrella is a moth of the family Scythrididae. It was described by Eberhard Jäckh in 1978. It is found in northern Italy.

References

nigrella
Moths described in 1978